Anomaloglossus guanayensis is a species of frog in the family Aromobatidae. It is endemic to Venezuela where it is only known from the Serranía de Guanay in the Bolívar state of southeastern Venezuela. It is a common frog and is thought to have wider distribution. Its natural habitat is tropical rainforest and it is known to occur in Monumentos naturales formaciones de Tepuyes. Males were found calling from shaded spots along a rocky stream.

References

guanayensis
Amphibians of Venezuela
Endemic fauna of Venezuela
Taxonomy articles created by Polbot
Amphibians described in 1997
Taxa named by Enrique La Marca